{{Infobox animanga/Print
| type            = manga
| author          = Yun Kōga
| publisher       = Enix (former)Ichijinsha
| publisher_en    = 
| demographic     = Shōnen
| magazine        = Fantastic Comic (July 25, 1992)Monthly Gangan Fantasy (April 1993 – February 2001)'
| first           = July 25, 1992
| last            = January 18, 2001
| volumes         = 8
| volume_list     = #Volume list
}}

 is an 8-volume fantasy manga series by Yun Kōga and published by Enix and later by Ichijinsha. It was adapted into a two episode OVA series.

Plot
The story circulates around a mysterious and dangerous island referred to simply as "G". A long time ago, a powerful god named Gestalt was banished to the earth and he had found refuge in the island known as G. To utter the name for which it stands is forbidden, for people were so afraid of the wrath of the god that they considered his name a curse. Father Olivier is a priest who has left his order and traveled to the island of G in order to discover the truth behind it. He ends up making the acquaintance of a young girl named Ohri, who turns out to be quite adept in magic.

Meanwhile, the head of the order has hired a dark elf, Suzu, to track down Olivier and bring him back. Suzu finds him easily enough. However, she hadn't anticipated the powerful sorceress in his company, Ohri. The girl disposes of Suzu for the moment, and she and the Father continue on. As if things weren't rough enough, the island of G has its share of monsters and magic-users to get in the way of their travels.

Media

Manga
The manga was first serialized in Enix's Monthly Gangan Fantasy (renamed Monthly GFantasy in April 1994 issue) between April 1993 and February 2001 issues, after the first chapter was published in Fantastic Comic (a special issue of Monthly Shōnen Gangan which launched Gangan Fantasy) on July 25, 1992, and collected into eight tankōbon volumes. The series was republished by Ichijinsha under the imprint, Zero-Sum Comics in 2005-2006, with new cover art. The  Ichijinsha edition was published in English by Viz Media.

Volume list
 Enix edition 

Ichijinsha edition

Drama CDs
There were 2 drama CDs that were commercially released by Enix. The main cast were Kae Araki as Ouri and Takehito Koyasu as Olivier. The first drama CD was released in September 1994 while the second drama CD was released in April 1996.

OVA
There was two-episode OVA adaptation directed by Osamu Yamasaki with music done by Toshiyuki Ōmori as well as casting assistance by 81 Produce. The first episode was released on January 22 and the second on February 21, 1997. The OVA was licensed in English by Media Blasters. The cast from the drama CDs was also used for the OVA.

Novels
The novels were published by Enix under the imprint, GFantasy Novels. The first volume was published in March 1999 and the second in August 1999.

 Reception 
Helen McCarthy in 500 Essential Anime Movies'' calls "comedy", including jokes and parodies of fantasy role-playing games, "the show's major selling point".

References

External links
Vol.1 review by ANN

1992 manga
1997 anime OVAs
Adventure anime and manga
Drama audio recordings
Fantasy anime and manga
Gangan Comics manga
Ichijinsha manga
Shōnen manga
Viz Media manga
Yun Kōga